Hartford Bridge may refer to:

Hartford Bridge, Cheshire, a bridge in Cheshire, England
RAF Hartford Bridge, former name of Royal Air Force Blackbushe, Hampshire, England
Hartford Bridge or Bulkeley Bridge, over the Connecticut River in Hartford, Connecticut, United States

See also
Hartfordbridge, a small village in Hampshire, England
Hertford bridge or Bridge of Sighs, Hertford College, Oxford, England
West Hartford Bridge, carrying Town Highway 14 across the White River, West Hartford, Vermont, United States